Rocky Valley Halt is an intermediate station on the Snowdon Mountain Railway. It consists of a narrow platform sheltered by the rocky outcrop of Llechog to the east. Immediately beyond the platform the line joins the exposed ridge on which it runs for about half a mile.
 

The halt is a later addition to the line, opening after the Second World War. Trains do not normally stop at the halt, but may terminate there if Clogwyn and the summit are considered too windy.

The station has one platform.

References

External links

 The line and its stations, via Snowdon Mountain Railway
 Edwardian 6" map showing the station's future location, overlain with modern satellite images and maps, via National Library of Scotland
 The station and line, via Rail Map Online
 Images of the station and line, via Yahoo

Railway stations in Great Britain opened in 1896
Llanberis
Heritage railway stations in Gwynedd